The Learning Lab is a private tuition and enrichment centre based in Singapore. It offers programmes in English, Mathematics and Science at the preschool, primary, secondary and pre-tertiary levels. The Learning Lab also offers classes for GEP students and for both the ‘O’ Level track and Integrated Programme.

Description
The Learning Lab runs academic enrichment and tuition programmes for pre-primary, primary, secondary and pre-tertiary students.

The Learning Lab also offers preparatory classes for the Gifted Education Programme screening test and selection test. The Gifted Education Programme caters to the top 1% of each academic year and introduces added curriculum topics and components for high-achieving students within Singapore's education system.

Similarly, preparatory classes for the Direct School Admission (DSA) programme are part of The Learning Lab lessons for Upper Primary students. Along with the PSLE, the DSA programme offers students entry into top Integrated Programme schools.

The Learning Lab has eight centres across the island, and is headquartered in United Square.  In the East, The Learning Lab has centres at Marine Parade Central, Century Square and Tampines Mall. In West Singapore, The Learning Lab centres can be found at Rochester Mall, Choa Chu Kang Centre and Jem. In the Northeast, parents can find TLL at Seletar Mall.

Track Record
The Learning Lab takes in students from Singapore. The Learning Lab places emphasis on getting their students into the Gifted Education Programme (GEP) and the admission to the Integrated Programmes at Raffles Institution, Raffles Girls' School, Hwa Chong Institution, Nanyang Girls' High School, NUS High, Anglo-Chinese School (Independent), Methodist Girls' School, Temasek Junior College, National Junior College, Catholic High School, CHIJ St. Nicholas Girls' School, Singapore Chinese Girls' School, Dunman High School, River Valley High School, Victoria School, Cedar Girls' Secondary School, and SOTA.

The centre’s students have gained admission into the best universities globally. In the US, such universities include the likes of Princeton, Harvard and Yale. In the UK, such universities include University of Oxford, the University of Cambridge and the London School of Economics and Political Science. In Singapore, the centre's students have been selected for entry into the elite University Scholars Programmes at the National University of Singapore, Singapore Management University and Nanyang Technological University. Many have been successfully admitted into the much sought-after medical, business and law schools.

In the 2017 PSLE, 52% of The Learning Lab students attained a T-score of 250 and above. 9 out of every 10 of their students scored an A or A* in their English, Chinese, Math and Science exams.

From 2012, the Ministry of Education declined to name the top PSLE students and correspondingly, The Learning Lab has not released specific data, although it did share that it had produced the top students in 2012 as well as in 2013.

Curriculum
Curriculum at The Learning Lab is designed by a team of 50 in-house curriculum specialists. In addition to being hired based on academic merit in their field of content expertise, curriculum specialists are also assessed in terms of their ability to think and write critically.

The curriculum management units are organised along subject and age-group lines. These curriculum management units generate its proprietary teaching materials and case studies in the English, Math, Science and Chinese subjects. Lesson materials often include articles from international publications such as The New York Times'''', The Atlantic, TIME Magazine as well as academic journals and publications.

Early Years Programme 

The Learning Lab Early Years Programme enrichment classes in English and Mathematics Nursery 2 and Kindergarten 1-2 age groups.

The Learning Lab Early Years develops its own curriculum materials.

Enrichment Programmes
The company has organised…

Special enrichment programmes including:
 Junior Space Camp with ex-NASA engineers 
 Motivational seminars with co-leaders of the Singapore Women's Everest team
Special holiday programmes including:
 Dream Academy, helmed by Singapore actress Selena Tan 
 Coding camps in collaboration with First Code Academy
 Making Sense of Money: Introduction Workshops to Financial Literacy
In addition, the company has sent student contingents to several high-profile conferences including
 Global Young Leaders Conference in Washington DC and NYC
 National Youth Leadership Forum on Business and Innovation at Stanford
 Global Young Innovators Initiative at Harvard Law School

See also
 Gifted Education Programme (Singapore)
 Integrated Programme
 Education in Singapore

References

Schools in Singapore